Alam Flora Sdn Bhd (styled as Alamflora) is one of the largest concession holders of Malaysia’s national solid waste management and public cleansing privatisation project. Alam Flora is a government-owned company which was established in 1995 under the Malaysian government. It was established as a wholly-owned subsidiary of DRB-HICOM Berhad, a Malaysian infrastructure conglomerate, and was sold in 2019 to Malakoff Corporation Berhad.

Background 
The company provides comprehensive waste management services to several concession areas in certain regions of Peninsular Malaysia, the Federal Territory of Kuala Lumpur, Putrajaya and Pahang working to manage and reduce waste with minimal environmental impact in Malaysia. It amasses an average of 1.01 million tonnes of waste annually. A substantial percentage of this waste originates from public cleansing where covered and open drains, beaches, highways, main roads, side and back lanes are manually and mechanically cleansed. The company has achieved local and international recognition with ISO 9001 and ISO 14001 certification.

History 
In June 2011, the Selangor State Government filed a counter-suit against Alam Flora, following the company's action to file a judicial review to challenge the state government's decision to ask all local authorities to take over the clean-up work in the state. Beginning 16 October 2011, Alam Flora has stopped providing cleaning of public places and collection of solid waste in Selangor. The move was made following the state government's decision to take over the service.

The company has also introduced the green concept cleaning equipment in conjunction with the 29th Kuala Lumpur Southeast Asian Games in 2017. It was one of the initiatives in line to raise public awareness on environmental care and sustainable solid waste management.

In August 2018, DRB-HICOM announced a proposal to sell its entire 97.37 per cent stake in Alam Flora to Malakoff Corporation Berhad for approximately RM944.6 million.

References

External links 

 Official Website

Malaysian brands
1995 establishments in Malaysia